Yassassin is an EP of the band Litfiba produced by Contempo Records.
Yassassin was only released as a vinyl, and all its tracks were used on different releases of Litfiba. Elettrica danza was published in the collection CD King of Silence, while the other two tracks were reiterated in the individual Forbidden always 33 rpm.
The two versions of "Yassassin" (track one and three) are different from each other, the first track is a long-play version of 7 minutes while the third is 4 ½ minutes.

Tracks 
Side A:
 Yassassin
Side B:
 Elettrica danza
 Yassassin (radio edit)

"Yassassin" is a cover from David Bowie; it's a Turkish word meaning "long live".

Personnel

 Ghigo Renzulli – guitar
 Gianni Maroccolo – bass
 Antonio Aiazzi – keyboard
 Piero Pelù – voice
 Ringo de Palma – Drums

References

Litfiba albums
1984 EPs

it:Yassassin (EP)